Joseph Jean Philippe Latreille (born April 22, 1938) is a Canadian retired professional ice hockey player who played four games in the National Hockey League. He played with the New York Rangers.

Career
At Middlebury College, Latreille set all NCAA goal scoring records. Phil Latreille scored 36 goals as a freshman, 57 goals as a sophomore and 77 as a junior. While the NCAA had a policy of restricting players to three seasons of eligibility at the time, Middlebury was not considered a serious threat to compete for the national title and thus did not field a freshman team, having their first-year players compete with the varsity squad. As a result Latreille was one of the few players during the era to play four years of varsity hockey and used his senior season to score 80 goals and 108 points. His points record was equaled by Dave Taylor in 1976–77 and surpassed by Bill Watson in 1984–85 with the later playing more than twice as many games (46) to surpass the mark. Latreille still holds eight NCAA records, including points per game in both a single season and career, along with goals per game in a season and career. He is the only three-time leading scorer in NCAA history as well as being the only player to average 5 points per game over the course of one season. Latreille remains the all-time leader in goals, both in a season and for a career, for the top level of play as well as being the career leader for points. He does not hold any Division I records as the NCAA did not introduce numerical classifications until 1973, though all of his scoring accomplishments were grandfathered into D-I.

In 2013, Latreille was named to the Vermont Sports Hall of Fame.

Career statistics

Awards and honors

References

External links

Vermont Sports Hall of Fame Bio

1938 births
Living people
Canadian ice hockey right wingers
New York Rangers players
Ice hockey people from Montreal
Middlebury Panthers men's ice hockey players
AHCA Division I men's ice hockey All-Americans